The Indian national cricket team toured Australia in the 1985–86 season. They played 3 Test matches. The Test series was drawn 0-0. Kapil Dev and Kris Srikkanth were awarded as joint players of the series.

After the Test series India also competed in a tri nation ODI tournament  with Australia and New Zealand they won 5 of their 10 round robin matches. In the best of three final with Australia they lost 2-0.

One of cricket's most respected and important figures, Steve Waugh, made his debut on the Boxing Day test at Melbourne in second test of the series.

Tour matches

Limited overs: Australian Capital Territory vs Indians

Four-day: South Australia vs Indians

Limited overs: Victoria Country vs Indians

Four-day: Victoria vs Indians

Four-day: Tasmania vs Indians

Test Series

First Test

Second Test

Third Test

External links
 India in Australia Test Series, 1985/86

References
 Wisden Cricketers Almanack 

1985 in Australian cricket
1985 in Indian cricket
1985–86 Australian cricket season
1986 in Australian cricket
1986 in Indian cricket
1985-86
International cricket competitions from 1985–86 to 1988